Beast most often refers to:
 Non-human animal
 Monster
Beast or Beasts may also refer to:

Bible
 Beast (Revelation), two beasts described in the Book of Revelation

Computing and gaming
 Beast (card game), English name of historical French game, the first card game to use bidding
 BEAST (computer security), a computer security attack
 BEAST (music composition), a music composition and modular synthesis application that runs under Unix
 Beast (lighting software), a computer-graphics lighting software
 Beast (Trojan horse), a Windows-based backdoor trojan horse
 Beast (video game), a 1984 ASCII game

Film and television
Beast (Beauty and the Beast), a character from the 1991 animated film Beauty and the Beast and sequels
Beast (2017 film), a British psychological thriller
Beast (2022 American film), an American thriller film directed by Baltasar Kormákur and starring Idris Elba
Beast (2022 Indian film), an Indian Tamil-language film
Beast (TV series), a 2000–2001 British sitcom
Beasts (TV series), a 1976 British horror programme by Nigel Kneale
Beast, a minor character in the television series Angel
Beast, a villain from the television series Doctor Who
Beast, a television series character from Law & Order: Criminal Intent (season 4)
Beast, stage name of professional wrestler Matt Morgan in American Gladiators
Beast Man, a character in the cartoon He-Man and the Masters of the Universe
Beastly, a character from the Care Bears franchise
Beastur, a character in the animated television series My Pet Monster

Literature
 Beast (Marvel Comics), a Marvel Comics character
 Beast (Benchley novel), a 1991 novel by Peter Benchley
 Beast (Kennen novel), a 2006 novel by Ally Kennen
 Beasts (Crowley novel), a 1976 novel by John Crowley
 Beasts (novella), a 2001 novella by Joyce Carol Oates
 Beast, a 2000 novel by Donna Jo Napoli
 Beast, a graphic novel by Marian Churchland, winner of the 2010 Russ Manning Award

Music

Groups
 Beast (Canadian band)
 Beast (South African band)
 Beast (South Korean band)

Albums
 Beast (Beast album) (2008)
 Beast (DevilDriver album) (2011)
 Beast (Magic Dirt album) (2007)
 Beast (Vamps album) (2010)
 Beast (V.I.C. album) (2008)

Songs
 "Beast" (Chipmunk song) (2008)
 "Beast" (Mia Martina song) (2015)
 "Beast" (Nico Vega song) (2006 EP version, 2013 single)
 "Beast", by Jolin Tsai from Muse (2012)
 "Beast (Southpaw Remix)", by Rob Bailey & The Hustle Standard from the film soundtrack Southpaw (2015)

Other
 Birmingham ElectroAcoustic Sound Theatre, a sound diffusion system

Other uses
 Beast (Alton Towers), a roller coaster at Alton Towers, Staffordshire, England
 Beast Lake, a lake in Minnesota, US
 Bengaluru Beast, an Indian basketball team
 Benjamin Butler (politician) (1813-1893), American politician and Governor of Massachusetts, American Civil War Union Army general nicknamed "Beast Butler" by Southern Whites
 L.A. Beast, the nickname of competitive eater Kevin Strahle
 Beast (street artist), a contemporary artist from Italy, who produces public artworks of a political nature
 Presidential state car (United States), the state car of the President of the United States, nicknamed "The Beast”

See also
 
 
 Beastie (disambiguation)
 Bestial (album), a 1982 album by Barrabás
 The Beast (disambiguation)
 Beast Beast, a 2020 coming-of-age drama film
 The Beastmaster, a 1982 sword and sorcery film